The National Day Laborer Organizing Network (NDLON) is an American organization whose mission aims at   improving the lives of day laborers. This organization was founded in Northridge, California, in July 2001, and is based in Los Angeles, California. NDLON functions in a form of direct democracy where day laborers who are in member organizations vote directly for the policies at NDLON's biannual assemblies. NDLON was founded at the first national gathering of day laborer organizations. It started with 12 community-based organizations and has grown to 36 member organizations.

Origins

Day laborer organizing dates back to the mid-1980s with efforts from the community to organize and educate day laborers about their rights as workers and also educate them on their civil liberties. These continued efforts in the late 1980s led to pilot programs that helped create worker centers. Around the 1990s the government became more involved in certain cities. Some supported the worker centers while others tried to get rid of the day laborer sites. During this time organizers developed a two-step approach.  The first step was a litigation strategy in the courts that challenged the solicitation ordinances. The second approach was an organizing strategy that allowed day laborers to come together to have more political inclusion and be able to represent themselves in front of governmental officials, law enforcement, and local stakeholders. In this time period, marked one of the first efforts to discuss day laborer rights through all the training and retreats. It helped develop the day laborers as leaders in their communities. In the late 1990s organizers from the different centers were all exchanging strategies and organizing practices like “libretas” which were books that were distributed to the whole country eventually. Towards the end of the decade more formal attempts were made to create a formal organization with the collaboration of all the worker centers. In 1999 a national coordinator was added and a national agenda was created which led to the creation of the NDLON.

Early Creation

On August 9, 2006, after the largest immigration rights demonstrations happened, the AFL-CIO signed an agreement to work together with NDLON to improve the working conditions of immigrant day laborers. This development and the agreement were made possible because of immigrant rights activists trying to progress the rights of day laborers. Two Los Angeles community-based organizations that helped in this historic movement were the Coalition for Humane Immigrant Rights of Los Angeles (CHIRLA) and the Institute of Popular Education of Southern California (IDEPSCA) . Los Angeles has the greatest population of day laborers and these two organizations paved the way to provide day laborers the education and skills to advocate and to develop as leaders. The Los Angeles day laborer organizers developed two strategies. The first strategy was to encourage participation and self-organization among the day laborers. This leadership methodology was based on Paulo Freire principles of popular education. The second strategy was to build a relationship and reduced community conflict between the day laborers and residents and merchants. This was referred to as ”human relations”. These efforts emerged from the advocates to protect the rights of the day laborers to seek work in public spaces as under the First Amendment. Framing their rights under the First amendment helped solve conflicts between the day laborers and the surrounding residents. The national network was able to emerge as worker centers throughout the different states that visited each other. For example, Casa Latina from Seattle and CASA of Maryland visited Los Angeles to observe the job centers. These exchanges led to the first National Day Laborer convention.

References

External links
Official site

Listening
Interview with NDLON executive director Pablo Alvarado from National Public Radio All Things Considered program, April 4, 2008

Non-profit organizations based in Los Angeles
Workers' rights organizations based in the United States
Organizations established in 2001
2001 establishments in California
Labor movement in California